Steeve Beusnard (born 27 June 1992) is a French professional footballer who plays as a midfielder for Pau FC.

Club career
Beusnard made his professional debut for Béziers in a 2–0 Ligue 2 win over AS Nancy on 27 July 2018. In July 2019 he left Béziers and signed for Gazélec Ajaccio. In December 2019, due to injury and family problems, he agreed a mutual termination of his contract with Gazélec Ajaccio, and subsequently signed for Pau FC.

References

External links
 
 Foot National Profile
 LFP Profile

1992 births
Living people
Sportspeople from Hérault
Association football forwards
French footballers
AS Béziers (2007) players
Gazélec Ajaccio players
Pau FC players
AS Fabrègues players
Ligue 2 players
Championnat National players
Championnat National 3 players
Footballers from Occitania (administrative region)